Sado Estuary Natural Reserve is a nature reserve in Portugal. It is one of the 30 areas which are officially under protection in the country. It is located between the municipalities of Alcácer do Sal, Comporta and Setúbal.

References

Nature reserves in Portugal
Ramsar sites in Portugal
Geography of Setúbal District
Natura 2000 in Portugal